Galium grayanum is a species of flowering plant in the coffee family known by the common name Gray's bedstraw. It is native to the high mountains of northern California, western Nevada and southwestern Oregon.

Galium grayanum is a mat-forming perennial herb that grows in green carpet-like patches amongst the rock litter of mountain slopes. Its creeping stems may reach up to about 20 centimeters long. Leaves are arranged in whorls of four at intervals on the stem. They are oval-shaped, pointed, slightly fleshy, and velvety. The plant is dioecious, but male and female flowers are similar in appearance, with small yellowish to reddish corollas at the ends of the leafy stems. The fruit is a nutlet with a coat of very long hairs. When in fruit with a large number of nutlets the plant takes on a fuzzy appearance.

Subspecies
Two subspecies are currently (May 2014) recognized:

Galium grayanum var. grayanum - California + Oregon
Galium grayanum var. nanum Dempster & Ehrend. - California (Tehama and Trinity Counties) to Nevada (Mt. Rose in Washoe County)

References

External links
Jepson Manual Treatment
USDA Plants Profile
Photo gallery

grayanum
Alpine flora
Flora of California
Flora of Nevada
Flora of Oregon
Flora of the Cascade Range
Flora of the Sierra Nevada (United States)
Plants described in 1956
Dioecious plants
Flora without expected TNC conservation status